The Algerian national ice hockey team is the national men's ice hockey team of Algeria.

History
Formed in 2008, Algeria became a member of the IIHF on September 26, 2019. The national team was formed with the increasing number of Algerians who are playing ice hockey around the world. In June 2008, Algeria took part in the inaugural Arab Cup in Abu Dhabi, also involving the national teams of Kuwait, Morocco, and the host nation, the UAE. Algeria finished last, with Algerian forward, Harond Litim winning the MVP of the tournament award.

Tournament record

Olympic Games

World Championship

Development Cup

African Cup

Arab Cup

Team

Current roster

Staff & Management
  Karim Kerbouche
  Ali Khaldi
  Harond Litim
  Nassim Boulakdem

All-time record against other nations
Last match update: 7 May 2022

See also 
Ice hockey in Africa
Morocco national ice hockey team
Namibia national inline hockey team
South Africa men's national ice hockey team
Tunisia national ice hockey team

Notes & references

Notes

References

External links
 Association Algérienne de Hockey sur Glace et Inline
Official Dailymotion Page
Official YouTube Page
National Teams of Ice Hockey
Prohockeynews.com article

National ice hockey teams in Africa
National ice hockey teams in the Arab world
Ice hockey